was a town located in Nasu District, Tochigi Prefecture, Japan.

As of 2003, the town had an estimated population of 8,694 and a density of 45.74 persons per km². The total area was 190.07 km².

On January 1, 2005, Shiobara, along with city of Kuroiso, and the town of Nishinasuno (also from Nasu District), was merged to create the city of Nasushiobara.

External links
 Nasushiobara official website 

Dissolved municipalities of Tochigi Prefecture